The Minister of Foreign Affairs (or simply the Foreign Minister) is the head of the Ministry of Foreign Affairs of the Government of Pakistan. The minister is responsible for overseeing the federal government's foreign policy and International relations. The responsibility of the foreign minister is to represent Pakistan and its government in the international community. The minister holds one of the Senior-most offices in the Cabinet of Pakistan. The office of the foreign minister was first held by Liaquat Ali Khan, who also served as the country's first prime minister. Several other prime ministers have held the additional charge of the office of the foreign minister.

List of foreign ministers of Pakistan 
The following is the list of all the previous foreign ministers of Pakistan to date, according to Ministry of Foreign Affairs.

See also

Constitution of Pakistan
President of Pakistan
Prime Minister of Pakistan
Finance Minister of Pakistan
Interior Minister of Pakistan
Defense Minister of Pakistan

External links
 Foreign Ministers of Pakistan (1947–2009)
 Ministry of Foreign Affairs
 Parliamentary Cabinet of Pakistan

 
Ministry of Foreign Affairs (Pakistan)